Novonikolayevsky is a rural locality (a village) in Naumovsky Selsoviet, Sterlitamaksky District, Bashkortostan, Russia. The population was 60 as of 2010. There is 1 street.

Geography 
Novonikolayevsky is located 22 km southwest of Sterlitamak (the district's administrative centre) by road. Novaya Vasilyevka is the nearest rural locality.

References 

Rural localities in Sterlitamaksky District